Treat Records was an American record label founded in March 1955 by Murray Katz.  It was based in New York City at 236 West 55th Street.  Larry Newton, formerly of Derby Records, was the general manager.  The label produced R&B and pop records.  The label folded later in 1955, but all of its recordings have been re-released.

Artists 
Treat had 8 releases, each on both 45 and 78 rpm.  The initial artists under contract with the label were:

Extant discography 
 Original releases 

 Selected re-issues
 T-501: Re-released on Lost-Nite 198
 T-502: Re-released on Lost-Nite 143

References 
General

Discography notes

Inline citations

Record labels established in 1955
Defunct record labels of the United States
1955 establishments in New York City